This is a list of the Nordic records in swimming. These are the fastest times ever swum by a swimmer representing one of the Nordic countries:

and the associated territory, .

As such, they are a sub-European, regional record.

The swimming federations/associations of Denmark, Norway and Sweden each produce listings of these Nordic records. This listing is based on a combination of these separate listings.
Danish Swimming Federation records page
Norwegian Swimming Federation records and statistics website

Long course (50 m)

Men

Women

Mixed relay

Short course (25 m)

Men

Women

Mixed relay

See also
List of European records in swimming
List of Danish records in swimming
List of Finnish records in swimming
List of Icelandic records in swimming
List of Norwegian records in swimming
List of Swedish records in swimming
List of Faroese records in swimming
Nordic Swimming Championships

References
General
Nordic Records 17 December 2021 updated
Specific

Nordic
Records
Records
Records
Records
Records
Records